MTHFD1 is a gene located in humans on chromosome 14 that encodes for a protein with three distinct enzymatic activities. C-1-tetrahydrofolate synthase, cytoplasmic also known as C1-THF synthase is an enzyme that in humans is encoded by the MTHFD1 (methylenetetrahydrofolate dehydrogenase 1) gene.

Function 

This gene encodes a protein that possesses three distinct enzymatic activities, methylenetetrahydrofolate dehydrogenase (1.5.1.5), methenyltetrahydrofolate cyclohydrolase (3.5.4.9) and formate–tetrahydrofolate ligase (6.3.4.3). Each of these activities catalyzes one of three sequential reactions in the interconversion of 1-carbon derivatives of tetrahydrofolate, which are substrates for methionine, thymidylate, and de novo purine syntheses. The trifunctional enzymatic activities are conferred by two major domains, an aminoterminal portion containing the dehydrogenase and cyclohydrolase activities and a larger synthetase domain.

Clinical significance 

Mutations of the MTHFD1 gene may cause methylenetetrahydrofolate dehydrogenase 1 deficiency, also known as combined immunodeficiency and megaloblastic anemia with or without hyperhomocysteinemia (CIMAH).

References

Further reading

External links 
 

EC 6.3.4